WNKW (1480 AM) is a radio station licensed to Neon, Kentucky, United States. The station is owned by Thomas R. Abdoo and Quinn Bowling Box, through licensee Sunshine Media Group, LLC.

History
The station went on the air as WNKY on July 1, 1956. On August 31, 2006, the station changed its call sign to WVSG. On April 13, 2009, WVSG became WGCK, taking its callsign from sister station WGCK-FM, and then changed again to WIZD on February 8, 2011. As of July 21, 2015, was called WUKB.

On June 1, 2018, the station changed its call sign to WNKW. It also broadcasts on an FM translator at 97.5 MHz.

References

External links

NKW
Letcher County, Kentucky
Radio stations established in 1956
1956 establishments in Kentucky
NKW